James Russel Reynolds (August 5, 1904 – February 16, 1963) was an American jazz pianist.

Reynolds led his own band at the Hollywood Cafe in New York City in the 1930s and 1940s, though he rarely recorded with this ensemble. He also played as a sideman with Kaiser Marshall (1935) and recorded with Red Allen, Jabbo Smith (1938), Hot Lips Page (1938–40, on sides for Decca Records), Bill Dillard (1947), and Larry Darnell (1952).

References
Howard Rye, "Jimmy Reynolds". Grove Jazz online.
[ James Reynolds] at Allmusic

1904 births
1963 deaths
American jazz pianists
American male pianists
20th-century American pianists
20th-century American male musicians
American male jazz musicians